Li Ping is the name of:

Li Yan (Three Kingdoms) or Li Ping (died 234), official and general of Shu Han during the Three Kingdoms period
Li Ping (geologist) (1924–2019), Chinese geologist and earthquake engineer
Ping Li (psychologist), Chinese-born psycholinguists at Pennsylvania State University
Li Ping (table tennis) (born 1986), Chinese-born Qatari table tennis player
Li Ping (weightlifter) (born 1988), Chinese weightlifter
Li Ping, fictional character in the novel The Legend of the Condor Heroes, see List of The Legend of the Condor Heroes characters

See also
Liping (disambiguation)